The Mayor of Bolzano is an elected politician who, along with the Bolzano's City Council, is accountable for the strategic government of Bolzano in Trentino-Alto Adige/Südtirol, Italy, the capital city of South Tyrol. 

The current Mayor is Renzo Caramaschi, elected in May 2016.

Overview
According to the Italian Constitution, the Mayor of Bolzano is member of the City Council.

The Mayor is elected by the population of Bolzano, who also elects the members of the City Council, controlling the Mayor's policy guidelines and is able to enforce his resignation by a motion of no confidence. The Mayor is entitled to appoint and release the members of his government.

Since 1995 the Mayor is elected directly by Bolzano's electorate: in all mayoral elections in Italy in cities with a population higher than 15,000 the voters express a direct choice for the mayor or an indirect choice voting for the party of the candidate's coalition. If no candidate receives at least 50% of votes, the top two candidates go to a second round after two weeks. The election of the City Council is based on a direct choice for the candidate with a preference vote: the candidate with the majority of the preferences is elected. The number of the seats for each party is determined proportionally.

1449–1948 

From 1449 onwards, when the earliest mayor, named Hans Trott, is recorded, the first citizen of Bolzano was called Bürgermeister. With the collapse of the Austro-Hungarian Empire at the end of World War I and the annexation of the Southern Tyrol by Italy in 1919–20, the burgomasters became sindaco (mayor).

From 1895 up to 1922, when Fascist squadrons occupied the town hall, the democratically elected Julius Perathoner was mayor, modernizing the city by sustaining a widespreading urban renewal.

Republic of Italy (since 1948)

City Council election (1948–1995)
From 1948 to 1995, the Mayor of Bolzano was elected by the City Council.

Notes

Direct election (since 1995)
Since 1995, under provisions of new local administration law, the Mayor of Bolzano is chosen by direct election.

Notes

See also
 Timeline of Bolzano

References

Bibliography

External links
 

Bolzano
 
Politics of Trentino-Alto Adige/Südtirol